The 1931 Stroud by-election was held on 21 May 1931.  The by-election was held due to the resignation of the incumbent Conservative MP, Sir Frank Nelson.  It was won by the Conservative candidate Walter Perkins.

Candidates
The Liberal Party ran 56 year-old Arthur William Stanton of Field Place, Stroud.  Stanton was a solicitor.  He had been their candidate at both the 1924 and 1929 general elections. Previously he had contested Gloucester for the Liberal Party at both the 1922 and 1923 general elections.

Result

Aftermath
Following the formation of the National Government, the Liberals chose not to run a candidate at the 1931 general election. Stanton did run again, at the 1935 general election in Chippenham, again without success. In 1937 he was appointed High Sheriff of Gloucestershire.

References

Stroud by-election
Stroud by-election
20th century in Gloucestershire
Stroud by-election
Stroud District
By-elections to the Parliament of the United Kingdom in Gloucestershire constituencies